John Lewis James Bonhote M.A., F.L.S., F.Z.S., M.B.O.U. (13 June 1875 – 10 October 1922) was an English zoologist, ornithologist and writer.

His name is usually stylized as J. Lewis Bonhote (see his list of publications below).

Bonhote was born in London and was educated at Harrow School and Trinity College, Cambridge. He was appointed private secretary to the Governor of the Bahamas in 1897, and was sub-director of the Zoological Gardens at Giza from 1913 to 1919. Bonhote was joint secretary (with Ernst Hartert) of the 4th International Ornithological Congress in London in 1905, secretary and treasurer of the Avicultural Society, secretary of the British Ornithologists' Union (1907–1913) and secretary-treasurer of the British Ornithologists' Club (1920–1922).

Bonhote died in 1922, and was buried on Kensal Green Cemetery.

One species of mammal was named by Bonhote: Bonhote's mouse, also Servant mouse Mus famulus.

One species is named after him (by Oldfield Thomas): Bonhote's gerbil Gerbillus bonhotei, nowadays Anderson's gerbil Gerbillus andersoni.

Bibliography 
Among the written publications of Bonhote are:

References

External links
 
Biography on the Natural History Museum website
Ibis Jubilee Supplement 1908

English ornithologists
English zoologists
1875 births
1922 deaths
Scientists from London
People educated at Harrow School
Fellows of the Linnean Society of London
Fellows of the Zoological Society of London
Members of British Ornithologists' Union
Alumni of Trinity College, Cambridge
20th-century British zoologists